Pieve Albignola is a comune (municipality) in the Province of Pavia in the Italian region Lombardy, located about 45 km southwest of Milan and about 20 km southwest of Pavia.

Pieve Albignola borders the following municipalities: Corana, Dorno, Sannazzaro de' Burgondi, Zinasco.

References

Cities and towns in Lombardy